Kalepolepo Fishpond, known by its older name Koiei.e. Loko Ia, is an ancient Hawaiian fishpond estimated to have been built between 1400 and 1500 AD. 

The fishpond is located in Kalepolepo Park in Kihei, Maui. In 1996, the Aoao O Na Loka Ia O Maui (Association of the Fishponds of Maui) began renovating Koiei.e., working closely with the Hawaiian Islands Humpback Whale National Marine Sanctuary.

Koieie ("rapid current") is classified as a loko kuapa (walled pond), a type of fishpond that uses lava rock and coral walls (kuapa) to keep water circulating while a wooden sluice gate (makaha) allows small fish to enter the pond to feed, but prevents them from leaving after they grow too large to slip between the gate's gaps. Species of fish once farmed by ancient Hawaiians include the awa (milkfish, Chanos chanos), amaama (flathead mullet, Mugil cephalus), and the aholehole (Hawaiian Flagtail, Kuhlia xenura).

The fishpond was listed on the National Register of Historic Places in 1996, as Kalepolepo Fishpond with alternate names Koiei.e. Fishpond and Kaonoulu Kai Fishpond.

Notes

References

External links
Maui Fishpond Association
Hawaiian Islands Humpback Whale NMS

Protected areas of Maui
Archaeological sites on the National Register of Historic Places in Hawaii
Farms on the National Register of Historic Places in Hawaii
Fishponds of Hawaii
Bodies of water of Maui
History of Maui
Buildings and structures in Maui County, Hawaii
Geography of Maui County, Hawaii
National Register of Historic Places in Maui County, Hawaii